Ensemble DRAj is a German Klezmer group dedicated to arranging and presenting songs in Yiddish. The term “draj” is the Yiddish translation of the German word “drei” (i.e.: “three”).

Genre and Style
Ensemble DRAj focuses their work on the interpretation of Yiddish lyrics. But still, the style of their
songs does not correspond to traditional Klezmer music. The musicians rather apply a
special composition technique, very similar to the art of composing chamber music. Their main
intention is to express their own individual feelings integrating their experience with classical
music, modern music and jazz.

History
Ensemble DRAj was founded in 1996 by Anette Krüger (vocals), Ralf Kaupenjohann (accordion),
and Ludger Schmidt (violoncello). But it was not until a year later - after a period of arduous
rehearsals that the group considered the songs to be mature enough to be presented to a public
audience. The first program, “Lieder aus den Ghettos” (“Songs from the ghettoes”) was first
performed in Essen (Kunstschacht Katernberg).

In 2000 the first CD Lieder aus den Ghettos was produced (EthnoArt/Essen). In 2001 Ensemble
DRAj was invited to perform at the 1. Buenos Aires Klezmer Festival in Argentina. But due to the
terrorist attacks on September 11 the concert was cancelled. A year later, the group was invited by
the Goethe-Institut of Lisbon to play at the Festival Europa.

In 2003 singer Anette Krüger left Ensemble DRAj and Manuela Weichenrieder joined the group. Her
first performance with the two instrumentalists took place in the same year at the 1. Klezmer Festival of Bremen.
In 2005 German radio station WDR 3 broadcast a special feature about Ensemble DRAj. At the
beginning of 2006 the second album Kinderjorn was published (Laika/Bremen). It was characterized
as “CD of the week” by the magazine bluerhythm.

It was also WDR (Westdeutscher Rundfunk) that invited the group to perform at the EBU Folk Music Festival 2006 in Finland (Kaustinen) as the only German representative. Some time later Ensemble DRAj took part in the music contest Creole – 1. Preis für Weltmusik aus NRW (Creole – First Prize for World Music in NRW) and achieved the recognition as one of the best groups.
In November 2006 the group started a new project in Essen together with Jürgen Wiersch, a well-known German lyric poet.

In 2007 WDR transmitted a live concert given in Dortmund in the famous domicil in Dortmund.

In 2008 Ensemble DRAj was invited to perform at the International Yewish Music Festival Amsterdam as the only
German group.

Discography
 Lieder aus den Ghettos (2000; EthnoArt)
 Carnival der Kulturen 1. Weltmusik - Made im Ruhrgebiet (2001; EthnoArt), Sampler
 Kinderjorn (2006; Laika)
 O bittre Zeit. Lagerlieder 1933-1945. (2006; Dokumentations- und Informationszentrum (DIZ) Emslandlager, Papenburg), Sampler
 nube de nanas para aspace (2010; producciones efímeras), Sampler
 Ale shvestern (2011; Laika)

References
 Apfeld, Wiltrud (Red.): klezmer. Hejmisch und hip. Essen: Klartext Verlag, 2003,  (Ausstellungskatalog mit 1 CD), S. 26; 30.
 Eckstaedt, Aaron: "Klaus mit der Fiedel, Heike mit dem Bass ...". Jiddische Musik in Deutschland., Berlin/Wien: Philo Verlagsgesellschaft mbH, 2003, S. 64.
 Gesthuisen, Birger: Musik aus einem Koffer voller Geschichte(n) - Ensemble DRAj: Deutscher Beitrag beim EBU-Festival 2006, in: Folker! Das Magazin für Folk, Lied und Weltmusik, Heft 4/2006, S. 32-33.
 Sibum, Helen: Fremd und doch vertraut. Drei Künstler ohne jüdische Herkunft geben dem Klezmer eine eigene Note. Dürfen sie das überhaupt?, in: Neue Ruhr/Neue Rhein Zeitung (NRZ), 1. Juni 2008 (Wochenend-Beilage, S. 2)

External links
 http://www.draj.de/

Klezmer groups